Emmett Tompkins (September 1, 1853 – December 18, 1917) was an American lawyer and politician who served one term as a U.S. Representative from Ohio from 1901 to 1903. He was the son of Congressman Cydnor Bailey Tompkins.

Biography 
Born in McConnelsville, Morgan County, Ohio, Tompkins moved to Athens County, Ohio, in 1865.
He attended the public schools and Ohio University at Athens.
He studied law.
He was admitted to the bar in 1875 and commenced practice in Athens, Ohio.
City solicitor in 1876 and 1877.
He served as mayor of Athens 1877-1879.
He served as prosecuting attorney of Athens County in 1879.
He served as delegate to the Republican State conventions in 1879, 1881, and 1883.
He served as member of the Ohio House of Representatives 1886-1890.
He moved to Columbus, Ohio, in 1889.
He served as member of the board of trustees of Ohio University.

He lost election for Mayor of Columbus, Ohio the spring of 1897 to Democrat Samuel Luccock Black.

Tompkins was elected as a Republican to the Fifty-seventh Congress (March 4, 1901 – March 3, 1903).
He resumed the practice of law in Columbus, Ohio.
He was appointed trustee of Ohio University in 1908.
He died in Columbus, Ohio, December 18, 1917.
He remains were cremated in Cincinnati, Ohio, and the ashes returned to his home in Columbus, Ohio.

References

External links

1853 births
1917 deaths
People from Athens, Ohio
People from McConnelsville, Ohio
Politicians from Columbus, Ohio
Republican Party members of the Ohio House of Representatives
Mayors of places in Ohio
Ohio University alumni
Ohio lawyers
Ohio University trustees
County district attorneys in Ohio
19th-century American politicians
Lawyers from Columbus, Ohio
19th-century American lawyers
Republican Party members of the United States House of Representatives from Ohio